The Warner Sportster is an American light-sport aircraft, designed and produced by Warner Aerocraft of Seminole, Florida. The aircraft is only supplied as a complete ready-to-fly-aircraft.

Design and development
The Sportster was designed by Jesse Anglin of Henderson, North Carolina. It was derived from his earlier design, the Warner Spacewalker II, to comply with the US light-sport aircraft rules. It features a cantilever low-wing, a single-seat or a two-seats-in-tandem open cockpit which can be optionally enclosed under a bubble canopy, fixed conventional landing gear and a single engine in tractor configuration.

The aircraft fuselage is made from welded steel tubing, with its wooden wings covered in doped aircraft fabric. The standard engine available is the  Continental O-200 four-stroke powerplant. The  Lycoming O-290 has also been used.

As of March 2017, the design does not appear on the Federal Aviation Administration's list of approved special light-sport aircraft.

Operational history
By March 2017 five examples had been registered in the United States with the Federal Aviation Administration, all in the experimental category.

Specifications (Sportster two-seater)

References

External links

Sportster
Light-sport aircraft
Single-engined tractor aircraft
Low-wing aircraft